Caliroa dionae is a sawfly whose larvae eat the leaves of the blueberry plant. It was first discovered near Trois-Rivieres, Quebec.

It is the first Caliroa in North America found to eat blueberry plants.

References

Tenthredinidae